WPDH (101.5 FM) is a commercial radio station licensed to Poughkeepsie, New York, and serving the Hudson Valley and Catskills. The station is owned by Townsquare Media and broadcasts a classic rock radio format.  Its studios and offices are on Pendell Road in Poughkeepsie.

WPDH has an effective radiated power (ERP) of 4,400 watts.  The transmitter site is on Illinois Mountain in Highland, New York.   WPDH is one of only four full-power Class B FM stations between New York City and Albany.  (WSPK, WHUD and WFGB are the three others.)  WPDH is also simulcast on a Class A station, 106.1 WPDA in Jeffersonville, New York. Several translators relay WPDH's digital subchannels.

History

WEOK-FM
In 1962, the station signed on as WEOK-FM.  It was the sister station to WEOK 1390 AM and was Poughkeepsie's second FM station after WKIP-FM (today's WSPK). The main purpose of the station at the outset was to provide Muzak programming to area offices and stores via its subcarrier.  By day, WPDH simulcast the AM's middle of the road (MOR) format, with block programming airing between the AM's sign off and 10:00 p.m.

In 1972, WEOK AM and FM were sold to the Dyson family (also owners of Dyson Racing) and with the sale came key changes to the FM side. The transmitter moved from a site in Milton (now used by WVKR) to the current Illinois Mountain site.  It upgraded to a full Class B signal and added FM stereo capabilities in the process.

Country Music to AOR
At the end of these upgrades, it relaunched as country music formatted WPDH. At the time, only some people owned FM receivers and almost no car radios were equipped for FM radio.  WPDH was beaten by New York City signal WHN after that station flipped to country.  With the poor ratings playing country music, management saw a hole for an album-oriented rock (AOR) station in the Hudson Valley.  The leading rock stations from New York City, 95.5 WPLJ and 102.7 WNEW-FM, were difficult to receive so far from Manhattan.  In 1976 WPDH abandoned country for rock music, and this format remains to this day.

Through its decades in rock radio, there have been several variations of WPDH's format.  At the outset, it was automated, with no disc jockeys.  Then, it added DJs, playing progressive rock along with an occasional jazz track. The format evolved through the 1980s as the station gradually tightened its playlist to the top selling albums of the day, and the last couple of decades of rock.

The splintering of rock in the 1980s and early 1990s had varying effects on WPDH.  The station added heavy metal into the playlist as well as early modern rock and European imports.  The station remained successful and was a solid #1 in the market in the early 1980s, and by the 1990s was alternating the #1 spot in the market with 104.7 WSPK's Top 40 sound.

Classic Rock
In 1994, WPDH owners Crystal Radio Group (the Dyson family spinoff headed by Rob Dyson) purchased Middletown-based 92.7 WKOJ and 1340 WALL from Orange & Rockland Utilities. With this purchase came an opportunity to both solve the new rock dilemma and to strengthen WPDH by owning its only direct competition. WPDH spent the latter part of 1994 and early 1995 evolving to Classic Rock while WKOJ flipped to alternative rock WRRV in April 1995.

WPDH's ratings went through some instability in the early years as classic rock.  It was the regular #2 to WSPK's #1 by the turn of the 21st Century.  Rob Dyson sold the Crystal Radio Group to Aurora Communications in 2001 which, in turn was bought out by Cumulus Media in 2002. Amid an extended drop in ratings, WPDH was relaunched as a mainstream rock station over Labor Day Weekend 2003. Gary Cee, formerly of WLIR, was hired as Program Director, and the station stabilized at the top of the ratings in both Dutchess and Orange counties.

In January 2012, Andrew Boris, program director of sister station WRRV, became the new Program Director of WPDH.
No formula changes in the programming were enacted.  Boris later began hosting the morning drive time show, in addition to his PD duties.

Changes in Ownership
On August 30, 2013, a deal was announced in which Cumulus would swap its stations in Dubuque, Iowa, and Poughkeepsie (including WPDH) to Townsquare Media in exchange for Peak Broadcasting's Fresno, California stations. The deal was part of Cumulus' acquisition of Dial Global.  Townsquare, Peak, and Dial Global are all controlled by Oaktree Capital Management.

The sale to Townsquare was completed on November 14, 2013.  Under Townsquare management, WPDH plays a large amount of classic rock with a few current and recent titles.

Current WPDH Personalities
 Andrew Boris & Robyn Taylor "The Boris & Robyn Morning Show" (weekdays 6-10am)
 Hopkins (middays 10am-2pm)
 Smitty (afternoons 2-6pm)
 Uncle Joe Benson (evenings 6pm-12am)
 Jackson "Jack The Ripper" George (Saturday 3-7pm, also host of "Sound Check" Sundays at 10pm)
 Nancy Reamy (traffic reporter for The Boris & Robyn Morning Show)

The Past WPDH Airforce

 Mark "The Coop" Cooper (died from a stroke in August 2013)
 Pete Clark (Morning show host and program director 1980-1984)
 Tim Massie (Morning news anchor 1980–1984)
 Johnny Tobin
 Kricket
 John Mulrooney
 Brian Jones (news director and morning/afternoon news anchor, 2000-2008; later news director at WHUD, WBPM, WLNA, WGHQ, WBNR and WSPK)
 Susan Browning, formerly at WNEW, WDRE/WLIR, WYNY, Y107, WFAS, now WHUD
 Gary Cee (former Program Director, now Program Director and afternoon host on WNNJ-FM, as well as Director of Operations of Clear Channel TriState Radio in Sussex, New Jersey and midday host on Z93 (WBWZ, also known as Rock 93.3)
 Ron Rizzi (former Program Director)
 Ron Nenni (later of WPYX)
 Mike Harris (became General Manager of WEOK/WPDH)
 Kenny Gonyea (later of WRWD-FM)
 Kevin Belcastro (later of WPYX, now PD at Southern Broadcasting Stations in GA)
 Stewart "Stew" Schantz (later of WSPK, later WSKS and then WUPE-FM, deceased June 11, 2010.)
 Rick Buser (former Music Director, later of WEXT, WBPM, WRNQ, WKZE-FM, and now with Fox News Radio)
 Chris Barnes (Afternoon news in 1983. Later of WBPM, WPXC Cape Cod, XM Satellite Radio, Fox News Radio, and now of USA Radio Networks)
 Pamela Brooks (now on WRKI, I-95 in Danbury, CT)
 Matthew Walsh (later of WKLS, CNN Headline News, CNN International)
 John Steffanci (later of WKIP)
 'Bubbles' (morning show sidekick with Schantz/Stefanci and Sussman/Stefanci)
 Joseph "Joe" Sussman  (later Program Director Q-104/WQBK-FM Albany and WPYX)
 Kevin Karlson
 Pete McKenzie
 Heather Ford
 Reno
 Steve Frankenberry (now on WBPM and assistant production director at Pamal, Poughkeepsie)
 Bill Palmeri (longtime Program Director, Operations Manager and General Manager), also launched WRRV/RRB as GM with Greg O'Brien PD and Boris MD. Now Area President for iHeartmedia Allentown and Williamsport, PA
 Greg O'Brien (former Program Director of both WPDH and WRRV. though not simultaneously, and before that, WPDH Music Director)
 Clayton "The Rock and Roll Rebel" Trag later of Q-104/WQBK Albany, Gone but never forgotten 1993.
 Michael "Mad Mike" Colvin (Producer of, and voice actor on, several WPDH morning programs Most Notably: "Wakin' Up with the Wolf", "Cooper & Zolz", and "Cooper & Tobin", Voice characters included "40's Man", "Cognac the Magnificent", "Guy", and parodies of various sports announcers voices.)
 Rockin' Steve
 Rick Zolzer
 Bob Carmody
 Erica Pierson (later WLNY-TV; now on-air at WHAR)
 Shelli Sexton
 Jeff Jensen - currently a traffic reporter on WINS
 Billy "The Moranimal" Moran (now producer of the Brother Wease show)
 Daniel "The Doctor" Giannascoli - now "Sergeant Dan" on Thunder 106
 Richie Coelho
 Greg Gattine (former Program Director, now on WDST in Woodstock, NY)
 Brandon Terry
 Scotty "On The Air" Perry, Voted Best Radio Disc Jockey In Hudson Valley & Best Disc Jockey Website in 2007s Best Of In The Time's Herald Record
 The Biker
 John "Tigman" Rutigliano - now works at WBWZ/Z93 in New Paltz, NY
 Justin Foy (now on WDST in Woodstock, NY)
 Jay Burstein
 Scott "The Candyman" Carlin (onetime Promotions Director, later Program Director then Operations Manager)
 Jim Hansen (a.k.a. Steve Clark on WCZX) - died suddenly after his first full-time air shift on WCZX, in 1994
 Chris Donahue (a.k.a. Marty Allen on WCZX)
 Thomas Licursi (aka "Tommy Potatoes")
 Amy Salerno (now a traffic reporter for WCBS-AM in New York City)
 Steven Colvin (Also part-time on WRRV 92.3 & 96.9 late-nights)
 Anthony "Tony" DeBarros
 Brando (now Producer/Mornings on 103.9 LI News Radio
 Greg Deichler
 Patty Rosborough
 Marshall "Sean Lennon" Rhoades (Now of Mole N' Zanes' Podcast of Rambling Randomness™ and digitalzoneent.com)

Notable alumni
 Mike Breen, sportcaster, began his career on WPDH/WEOK around 1982-83, reading the news in the morning. Later, news/sports sidekick for Imus in the morning on NBC, play-by-play commentator for the NBA on ABC and the lead commentator for New York Knicks games on the MSG network. He also works NBA games for ESPN, and was formerly a play-by-play announcer for New York Giants preseason games, as well as for regular season NFL games on both Fox and NBC.
 Jason Barrett, former program director of WPEN in Philadelphia, Pennsylvania, began his career hosting the wrestling show "No Holds Barred" on Sunday nights.
 Freddie Coleman, now of GameNight on ESPN Radio, entered radio at WPDH as music director and overnight host, later working at sister station WCZX.
 Jay Reynolds, ESPN Radio; spent time at WPDH as news anchor & news director (1992-1998).
 Karlson and McKenzie of WZLX in Boston, Massachusetts spent time at WPDH before returning to Boston.
 Bob "The Wolf" Wohlfeld, longtime morning host.
 Dead Air Dave started his on-air career at WPDH, years before becoming a personality on 92.3 K-Rock New York and later adding dump button duties for The Howard Stern Show.
 Roger "The Rajah" Clark did fill-in newscasts on WPDH. He is now a reporter and fill-in anchor for New York One News in New York City.
 Loscalzo from WNYU started his pro career at WPDH  and went on to WRCN, WDRE and WXRK.  He's now at MTV.

HD Radio
Cumulus Broadcasting began upgrading its stations to HD Radio broadcasting in 2005. One of the first ten stations to be upgraded was WPDH.

WPDH uses its HD2 and HD4 digital subchannel to rebroadcast co-owned oldies WALL 1340 AM and its HD3 subchannel to rebroadcast Spanish adult hits WEOK 1390 AM.

See also
 WPDA

References

External links
 
 

Poughkeepsie, New York
PDH
Classic rock radio stations in the United States
Radio stations established in 1962
Townsquare Media radio stations